

H04A Glycogenolytic hormones

H04AA Glycogenolytic hormones
H04AA01 Glucagon
H04AA02 Dasiglucagon

References

H04